Radella Cricket Grounds is a Cricket ground in Sri Lanka situated in Radella, a village close to Nuwara Eliya, Sri Lanka. The grounds are also known as Dimbula Cricket Club Ground.

Importance

Radella Cricket Grounds is one of the few cricket grounds situated 4,000 ft above sea level. Its setting is described as one of the most picturesque cricket grounds in the world.

History

Radella Cricket Grounds is home to the Dimbula Athletic & Cricket Club, which was founded in 1856. The first recorded match played in 18–19 November 1892, between touring Lord Hawke's XI and Up-country XI. Another notable match the grounds played host to was the tour match of MCC  captained by future England cricket captain Mike Smith against Up-country XI in 1962.

The grounds have been used as a venue for rugby union by Dimbula Cricket Club. In fact, the finals of the Clifford Cup have been played on the grounds.

Recent times

Probably the ground's most noted game is New Zealand's tour match against the President's XI in 1983/84 tour. Unfortunately, the game was washed out due to rain. But Sir Richard Hadlee said that Sri Lanka is a good place for Swing Bowling owing to higher altitude and cloudy sky.

Since then little cricket has been played here. Four Youth Cricket World Cup matches were played here including the match between Pakistan under-19s versus Kenya under-19s.
The MCC's match against Janashakthi Group in 2000/01 is the last notable match played on the grounds.

International Cricket Council helps Sri Lanka Cricket to renovate the grounds.

List of matches played at the ground

First Class matches
 Sri Lanka Board President's XI v New Zealand - March 5, 1984

List A matches
 Sri Lanka v Zimbabwe - December 15, 1983

Youth Cricket World Cup matches
 Kenya Under-19s v Pakistan Under-19s - January 12, 2000
 Ireland Under-19s v Netherlands Under-19s - January 19, 2000
 USA Under-19s v Ireland Under-19s - January 21, 2000
 USA Under-19s v Netherlands Under-19s - January 23, 2000

Other matches
 Up-Country XI v Lord Hawke's XI - November 18, 1892
 Dimbula and Dikoya v New South Wales - January 15, 1914
 Up-Country XI v Marylebone Cricket Club - February 13, 1962
 Dimbula Cricket Association President's XI v Madras - April 2, 1966
 Dimbula Cricket Association President's XI v State Bank of India - August 10, 1966	
 Dimbula Cricket Association President's XI v Hyderabad Blues - April 5, 1967
 Dimbula Cricket Association President's XI v Hong Kong - March 27, 1971
 Nuwara Eliya District v Gloucestershire - April 5, 1987
 Janashakthi Group v Marylebone Cricket Club - March 1, 2001

See also

 Rangiri Dumbulla Stadium

References

External links
CricketArchive
Images of Ceylon

Cricket grounds in Sri Lanka
Sports venues in Central Province, Sri Lanka